Shamzun-e Chah Bagh (also Romanized as Shamzūn-e Chāh Bāgh; also known as Shamzān-e Chāh Bāgh) is a village in Qaleh Ganj Rural District, in the Central District of Qaleh Ganj County, Kerman Province, Iran. At the 2006 census, its population was 504, in 90 families.

References 

Populated places in Qaleh Ganj County